Saïda Hossini (born 1950) is a Moroccan palaeontologist, specialising in frogs of the Pleistocene.

Career 
Hossini teaches at the University of Moulay Ismail, Faculté des Sciences in Meknes. She studied for her doctoral research in Paris, researching anuran species of the late oligocene and the miocene in France. Her work in Morocco includes the examination of cave deposits and examined amphibian remains from the Thomas Quarry Site, near Casablanca. Hossini identified for the first time the presence of the genus Baleaphryne for the first time in Africa at the Jebel Irhoud ("Ocre" quarry) site in Morocco. She also investigated the faunal remains at the cave of That El Ghar (Tetuan), exploring palaeoenvironment of North Africa between the pleistocene and the holocene.

New species 

In 1993, Hossini was the person to describe a new species of frog, Latonia ragei. Evidence for the species came from the fossil record in three localities: Coderet, Laugnac and 'St Gerand-Le-Puy'. The discovery and identification of a Latonia mandible, led to the classification of this species  as new to science. In other examples of ragei, Hossini worked on maxilla surface sculpturing to produce identification.

References 

Moroccan women academics
Moroccan women scientists
Moroccan geologists
Living people
1950 births